The Sealdah Main and North section refer to a set of rail lines which connect the city of Kolkata with its northern suburbs and with the North 24 Parganas, Nadia and Murshidabad districts of West Bengal, India along the eastern bank of the Hooghly river. It is a part of the Kolkata Suburban Railway and is under the jurisdiction of the Sealdah railway division of the Eastern Railway zone of Indian Railways.

This section also has two international railway transit points with Bangladesh at Gede and Petrapole from where majority of the freight traffic from India is imported into Bangladesh.

Lines and services
The section consists of multiple lines which have been treated in detail in separate sections along with their branch lines and services:

 Calcutta Chord link line
 Andul–Calcutta Chord link (ACCL) branch line
 Sealdah–Ranaghat–Gede line
 Naihati–Bandel branch line
 Kalyani–Kalyani Simanta branch line
 Sealdah–Bangaon line
 Barasat–Hasnabad branch line
Ranaghat–Bangaon branch line
Dum Dum Cantonment–Biman Bandar branch line (now dismantled)
 Ranaghat–Krishnanagar City–Lalgola branch line
 Kalinarayanpur–Shantipur–Krishnanagar City branch line
 Krishnanagar City–Nabadwip Ghat branch line

All the lines, except for the ACCL branch line and the Krishnanagar City–Lalgola section of the Lalgola branch line are suburban sections which form a part of the Kolkata Suburban Railway system.

History

Pre-Partition (1857-1947) 

The Eastern Bengal Railway  company was formed in 1857 for the construction and working of a line from Calcutta to Dacca, with a branch to Jessore. The company also acquired a steam vessel service operating between Kushtia and Dacca on the Padma river. With the successful construction and opening of the Hardinge Bridge in 1915 and gauge conversion of the Santahar–Parbatipur–Siliguri line from 1924 to 1926, the Calcutta–Siliguri broad gauge line was completed and became the main line of the Eastern section of EBR.

The Bengal Central Railway  company constructed two broad gauge lines: one connecting Ranaghat and Bangaon in 1882 and the other connecting Dum Dum with Khulna (now in Bangladesh), via Bangaon which opened in stages and was completed in 1884. These lines were merged with Eastern Bengal Railway in 1904, with the Sealdah–Bangaon–Jessore–Khulna line becoming the main line of the Central section of EBR.

This line was amalgamated with EBR on 1 July 1904. EBR further extended the line from Krishnanagar to Nabadwip Ghat and opened the line for traffic from 30 June 1926. In 1925 an alternate  broad gauge line was built from Kalinarayanpur (Churni Bridge) to Shantipur and the old  gauge line between Shantipur and Aistola Ghat was abandoned.

It was further extended via Taki to Hasnabad (Chingrighata) in 1909. This was further extended to Belgachia in 1914 and was known as the Shyambazar Branch.

Post-Partition (1947-) 
Post partition of India in 1947, the Eastern and Central sections of EBR were divided between India and East Pakistan. The direct connection between South Bengal and North Bengal was affected as the Calcutta–Siliguri line was snapped resulting in Haldibari–Chilahati and Gede–Darsana becoming international transit points for trains. In the Central section, Petrapole railway station was created as the terminus on the Indian side while the Benapole railway station became the terminus in the East Pakistani side of the line. The Barisal Express, launched in 1884, from Sealdah to Khulna continued post-partition until rail services between the two countries were suspended due to the Indo-Pakistani War of 1965.

The Barasat–Basirhat Light Railway closed down in 1955 due to increasing losses. However a new  broad gauge line was built in a new alignment between Barasat and Hasnabad from 1957 to 1962. The Shyambazar branch line was abandoned.

The gauge conversion of the Shantipur–Krishnanagar City–Nabadwip Ghat line to  broad gauge began on 2010. The electrified broad gauge line between Shantipur and Krishnanagar City was opened for service in 2012. The construction of the rest of the section along with a new bridge over the Ganges river is blocked due to land disputes.

Electrification
The Sealdah Main and North section lines are fully electrified with 25 kV AC overhead system. The Ranaghat–Shantipur and Ranaghat–Krishnanagar City lines were electrified in 1964. The ACCL and Kalyani Simanta branch lines were electrified in 1972 and 1979 respectively.

EMU Carsheds 
The Sealdah North section is primarily served by 9-car EMU rakes from the Narkeldanga EMU Carshed. It was originally a steam locoshed which was transformed into an EMU carshed in 1963 along with the facility to maintain electric locomotives as well. As of December 2021, it contains 29 9-car EMU rakes, a few of which served the Sealdah South section mostly via the Circular line, while the rest served the Sealdah North section.

To handle the increased traffic requirements of the Sealdah–Bangaon, Barasat–Hasnabad and Ranaghat–Bangaon lines, a new EMU carshed was opened in Barasat in 1990. In 2018, three phase IGBT based 12-car EMU rakes were introduced in this carshed. As of December 2021, the shed contains 8 9-car EMU rakes and 25 12-car EMU rakes, 6 of which are three phase IGBT based.

In 2007, a new EMU carshed was commissioned in Ranaghat to cater to the increased traffic requirements in the Ranaghat–Gede, Ranaghat–Lalgola and Ranaghat–Shantipur–Krishnanagar City lines. MEMU services were also introduced in 2012 between Sealdah and Lalgola. As of December 2021, the shed contains 15 12-car EMU rakes and 5 MEMU rakes of which one is a 8-car rake while the rest are 12-car rakes.

References

Rail transport in West Bengal
Sealdah railway division